Jeffrey A. Gettleman (born 1971) is an American Pulitzer prize-winning journalist. Since 2018, he has been the South Asia bureau chief of The New York Times based in New Delhi.  From 2006-July 2017, he was East Africa bureau chief for The Times.

Background

Personal life
Jeffrey was born in 1971, the son of Robert William Gettleman (b. 1943), a judge of the United States District Court for the Northern District of Illinois, and Joyce R. Gettleman, a psychotherapist with a private practice in Evanston. Gettleman's sister Lynn Gettleman Chehab is a physician.

Gettleman is married to Courtenay Morris, a former assistant public defender who is now a web producer for the Times. The couple first met while both were attending Cornell University. The wedding was held on October 29, 2005 at their home in Hoboken, New Jersey, with Gettleman's father officiating at the ceremony.

Education
Gettleman graduated from Evanston Township High School in 1989, and Cornell University in 1994 with a B.A. in Philosophy. Initially, he did not know what he wanted to do after graduation, so took a leave of absence to back pack around the world which he says help set his life trajectory. However, when a professor suggested journalism as a profession, he scoffed at the idea, saying "That was the dumbest idea I had heard... who wants to work for a boring newspaper?". Beginning in 1994, he was a communications officer for the Save the Children organization in Addis Ababa.

After his graduation from Cornell, Gettleman received a Marshall Scholarship to attend Oxford University, where he received a master's degree in Philosophy in June 1996. While at Oxford, he was the first American editor of Cherwell, the university's student newspaper.

Career
Gettleman began his journalism career as a city hall and police reporter for the St. Petersburg Times from 1997–1998. In 1999, he transferred to the Los Angeles Times as a general assignment reporter. He became bureau chief in Atlanta two years later, and was also a war correspondent for the broadsheet in Afghanistan and the Middle East.

In 2002, Gettleman joined The New York Times as a domestic correspondent in Atlanta, where he later became the bureau chief. He reported from Iraq beginning in 2003, where he did a total of five tours. After a stint as a reporter for the paper's Metro desk in 2004, he became a foreign correspondent in July 2006 for the Nairobi-based East Africa bureau of The New York Times. Only a month later, he would be named chief.

Currently, Gettleman covers over ten countries, often under difficult circumstances. He has focused the majority of his work on events in Congo, Kenya and Tanzania in East-Central Africa, where he has reported on atrocities involving rape, mutilation as well as ritualized murders of albinos, among other issues. His often straightforward, non-cynical approach toward such difficult stories has been colloquially dubbed the "Gettleman method" by Jack Shafer.

Gettleman has also covered conflicts in Sudan, Ethiopia, Somalia, Egypt and Yemen. In the 2004 spring, he along with photographer Lynsey Addario were abducted for several hours by militants in Fallujah. According to Gettleman, the pair were eventually released because he had successfully posed as Greek and concealed his passport in Addario's trousers, where he had guessed his captors would not search.

In addition, Gettleman has served as a commentator on CNN, BBC, PBS, NPR and ABC.

In 2017, Gettlemen published his memoir, Love, Africa: A Memoir of Romance, War, and Survival.

Awards
 First place for general reporting by Florida Press Club (1997)
 First place for spot news by Tampa Bay Society of Professional Journalists (1997 and 1998)
 Los Angeles Times Editorial Award for Breaking News (2001)
 Overseas Press Club Award (2003)
 Overseas Press Club Award (2008)
 George Polk Award for International Reporting (2011)
 Pulitzer Prize for International Reporting (2012)

References

External links

1971 births
Living people
Cornell University alumni
Alumni of Balliol College, Oxford
American male journalists
Los Angeles Times people
The New York Times writers
Marshall Scholars
Place of birth missing (living people)
Pulitzer Prize for International Reporting winners
Writers from Evanston, Illinois
George Polk Award recipients